Baba Banda Singh Bahadur Engineering College (BBSBEC) is an engineering college in Fatehgarh Sahib, Punjab, India. It was established in 1993 by the Baba Banda Singh Bahadur Educational Trust formed under the patronage of Shiromani Gurdwara Parbandhak Committee with the approval of the Government of Punjab.

References 

All India Council for Technical Education
Engineering colleges in Punjab, India
Fatehgarh Sahib
1993 establishments in Punjab, India
Educational institutions established in 1993